Mexico participated in the 2018 Winter Paralympics in Pyeongchang, South Korea. Their sole competitor is para-alpine skier Arly Velásquez. This marks their fourth Winter Paralympics.  They first went to the 2006 Winter Paralympics in Turin.  Mexico's best winter sport is para-alpine skiing.

Team 
As mentioned the team's sole representative is para-alpine skier Arly Velásquez.

The table below contains the list of members of people (called "Team Mexico") that will be participating in the 2018 Games.

History 
Mexico arrives in Pyeongchang to compete in their fourth Winter Paralympics.  They first went to the 2006 Winter Paralympics in Turin.  Mexico's best winter sport is para-alpine skiing.

Alpine skiing 
For the super combined event, the first run is the super-G and the second run is the slalom.

Men

References 

2018
Nations at the 2018 Winter Paralympics
2018 in Mexican sports